Portugal competed in the Junior Eurovision Song Contest 2021 in Paris, France on 19 December. Portuguese broadcaster RTP is responsible for the participation, and selected Simão Oliveira to represent the country, after he won the second season of The Voice Kids Portugal.

The country returned to the competition after an absence of one year due to the COVID-19 pandemic.

Background 

Portugal provisionally confirmed their participation in the  contest, but ultimately withdrew due to the COVID-19 pandemic.

Artist and song information

Simão Oliveira 

Simão Oliveira (born 11 May 2007) is a fado singer from Arouca, Portugal. He started singing at the age of four, and also plays clarinet. He participated in the second season of The Voice Kids, airing from 10 January 2021. After his blind audition, he joined Team Carlão, but during the battles he was saved by another coach, Fernando Daniel. Oliveira went on to win the final of the competition on 18 April 2021, receiving the most votes through televoting. A few moments before he was announced as the winner, presenter Catarina Furtado announced that the winner of the show will also represent the country at the Junior Eurovision Song Contest. He also won a record contract with Universal Music Portugal.

O Rapaz 
On 27 October 2021, RTP revealed that the country's entry is called "", written by Fernando Daniel and Diogo Clemente. The song was released on 12 November 2021.

At Junior Eurovision
During the opening ceremony and the running order draw, which both took place on 13 December 2021, Portugal was drawn to perform nineteenth (last) on 19 December 2021, following North Macedonia.

At the end of the contest, Portugal received 101 points, placing 11th out of 19 participating countries, giving Portugal its best result in the contest to date.

Voting

Detailed voting results
The following members comprised the Portuguese jury:
 Afonso Silva
 Joana Almeida
 Andrea Basílio
 Elisa
 Luís Marques

References 

Portugal
Junior
Junior Eurovision Song Contest